Evelyn Orley (born 10 July 1966) is a Swiss former professional golfer.

Family
Orley's grandfather Zoltan Őssy-Őlvy represented Hungary in the 1936 Summer Olympics in shooting, and her father Thomas Orley, born in Budapest, competed in fencing for the U.S. in the 1964 Summer Olympics. Her father later moved to Switzerland, where Evelyn was born. Her ultimate dream in golf had been to compete in the Olympics, even petitioning the International Olympic Committee in 1988 to add the sport.

Career
Orley won the 1983 Girls Amateur Championship and played college golf with the Duke Blue Devils at Duke University in Durham, North Carolina where she won the 1985 ACC Championship individually. 

She turned pro in 1990 and won twice that year, claiming the Singapore Ladies Open and the Swiss Ladies Classic, her native country's national championship, the highlight of her career. In 1991 she was runner-up at the Ladies English Open after losing a playoff with Kitrina Douglas, and in 1992 she was runner-up at the Ford Ladies Classic. When she missed 19 of 20 cuts on the 1993 LPGA Tour, Orley started planning for a future outside of golf. She returned to LET and was runner-up at the 1995 Costa Azul Ladies Open, but soon retired from tour and became a sales director for an investment management firm.

Orley regained her amateur status in 2002. She turned 50 in July 2016 and played the U.S. Senior Women's Amateur, returning to competition golf after a 20-year hiatus, with 1988 U.S. Women's Open-winner Liselotte Neumann as her caddie. The qualifier where she shot 72 to earn to earn medalist honors was her first competitive round since retiring from tour. She competed in the inaugural U.S. Senior Women's Open in 2018.

Professional wins (2)

Ladies European Tour wins (1)
1990 Bonmont Ladies Swiss Classic

Ladies Asian Golf Tour wins (1)
1990 Singapore Ladies Open

Team appearances
Amateur
Espirito Santo Trophy (representing Switzerland): 1984, 1986, 1988
European Ladies' Team Championship (representing Switzerland): 1985

References

Swiss female golfers
Duke Blue Devils women's golfers
Ladies European Tour golfers
LPGA Tour golfers
Sportspeople from Zürich
Sportspeople from San Diego County, California
1966 births
Living people
20th-century Swiss women